Major General James Rowland Martin,  is a senior British Army officer. Since 2021, he has been General Officer Commanding of the 3rd (United Kingdom) Division.

Military career
Martin was commissioned into the Princess of Wales's Royal Regiment with effect from 7 August 1993. He became commander of the 1st Armoured Infantry Brigade in November 2018, commander of 16 Air Assault Brigade in July 2020, and General Officer Commanding 3rd (United Kingdom) Division in October 2021.

Martin was awarded the Military Cross for gallant and distinguished service in Afghanistan on 25 March 2011, and was appointed a Companion of the Distinguished Service Order for distinguished services in Afghanistan on 26 February 2015. He was appointed an Officer of the Order of the British Empire for gallant and distinguished services in the field on 21 April 2017.

References

British Army generals
Princess of Wales's Royal Regiment officers
Officers of the Order of the British Empire
Companions of the Distinguished Service Order
Recipients of the Military Cross
Year of birth missing (living people)
Living people